The Bottom Line Encore Collection is the fourth live album by Harry Chapin, released in 1998 (see 1998 in music) as a two-CD compilation. It was recorded at the Village in New York, and was Harry's two-thousandth concert. The setlist was composed of songs throughout Harry's music career (1972–1981).

Track listing
Disc 1:
"Taxi" - 6:52
"Story of a Life" - 5:21
"I Miss America" - 6:56
"Mercenaries" - 6:04
"A Better Place to Be" - 9:16
"I Wanna Learn a Love Song" - 4:24
"Mr. Tanner" - 6:55
"W*O*L*D" - 4:54

Disc 2:
"Cat's in the Cradle" - 3:51
"Mismatch" - 4:10
"Old Folkie" - 5:33
"Let Time Go Lightly" - 4:41
"Remember When the Music" - 8:45
"30,000 Pounds of Bananas" - 12:48
"Sequel" - 7:11

Personnel 
Harry Chapin - guitar, vocals
Steve Chapin - keyboards
John Wallace - bass
Dougie Walker - lead guitar
Howie Fields - drums
Yvonne Cable - cello

Harry Chapin albums
Live albums published posthumously
1998 live albums